The 2002–03 Philadelphia Flyers season was the Philadelphia Flyers' 36th season in the National Hockey League (NHL). The Flyers lost in the second round of the 2003 Stanley Cup playoffs to the Ottawa Senators in six games.

Off-season
The Flyers hired former Dallas Stars and Stanley Cup-winning head coach Ken Hitchcock to replace the fired Bill Barber.

Regular season
In 2002–03, Roman Cechmanek had a club record 1.83 goals against average (GAA) and the Flyers acquired Sami Kapanen and Tony Amonte prior to the trade deadline; however, they fell one point short of a second straight Atlantic Division title.

The Flyers had reliable goaltending. They tied the New Jersey Devils for the fewest goals allowed with just 166 and Roman Cechmanek and Robert Esche combined for eight shutouts.

Season standings

Playoffs
The Flyers endured a very long and brutal seven game first round match-up with the Toronto Maple Leafs that featured three multiple overtime games, all in Toronto. After winning Game 7, 6–1, the Flyers fought the Ottawa Senators in the second round with equal vigor as they split the first four games of the series, Cechmanek earning shutouts in both wins. Cechmanek's inconsistency showed through, however, as he allowed ten goals in the final two games and Ottawa advanced in six games. Cechmanek was traded to the Los Angeles Kings for a 2004 second round draft pick during the off-season despite having the second-best goals against average and save percentage in the NHL over his three years in Philadelphia.

Schedule and results

Preseason

|- style="background:#cfc;"
| 1 || September 19 || @ Washington Capitals || 4–1 || 1–0–0 ||
|- style="background:#fcf;"
| 2 || September 21 || New Jersey Devils || 1–5 || 1–1–0 ||
|- style="background:#fcf;"
| 3 || September 22 || @ New York Rangers || 4–6 || 1–2–0 ||
|- style="background:#cfc;"
| 4 || September 24 || New York Islanders || 4–2 || 2–2–0 ||
|- style="background:#fcf;"
| 5 || September 26 || @ New Jersey Devils || 0–4 || 2–3–0 ||
|- style="background:#cfc;"
| 6 || September 27 || @ Carolina Hurricanes || 5–1 || 3–3–0 ||
|- style="background:#cfc;"
| 7 || October 1 || New York Rangers || 5–3 || 4–3–0 ||
|- style="background:#fcf;"
| 8 || October 2 || @ New York Islanders || 1–4 || 4–4–0 ||
|- style="background:#cfc;"
| 9 || October 5 || Washington Capitals || 3–2 || 5–4–0 ||
|-

|-
| Legend:

Regular season

|- style="background:#ffc;"
| 1 || October 10 || @ Edmonton Oilers || 2–2 OT || 0–0–1–0 || 1 || 
|- style="background:#cfc;"
| 2 || October 12 || @ Calgary Flames || 5–4 || 1–0–1–0 || 3 || 
|- style="background:#cfc;"
| 3 || October 15 || @ Montreal Canadiens || 6–2 || 2–0–1–0 || 5 || 
|- style="background:#ffc;"
| 4 || October 17 || New York Islanders || 3–3 OT || 2–0–2–0 || 6 || 
|- style="background:#cfc;"
| 5 || October 19 || Washington Capitals || 3–1 || 3–0–2–0 || 8 || 
|- style="background:#fcf;"
| 6 || October 22 || @ Buffalo Sabres || 1–2 || 3–1–2–0 || 8 || 
|- style="background:#cfc;"
| 7 || October 24 || Montreal Canadiens || 6–2 || 4–1–2–0 || 10 || 
|- style="background:#cfc;"
| 8 || October 26 || @ New York Islanders || 6–2 || 5–1–2–0 || 12 || 
|- style="background:#cfc;"
| 9 || October 29 || Ottawa Senators || 2–1 || 6–1–2–0 || 14 || 
|- style="background:#cfc;"
| 10 || October 31 || Phoenix Coyotes || 6–2 || 7–1–2–0 || 16 || 
|-

|- style="background:#cfc;"
| 11 || November 2 || Washington Capitals || 2–1 || 8–1–2–0 || 18 || 
|- style="background:#cfc;"
| 12 || November 5 || @ Carolina Hurricanes || 2–1 OT || 9–1–2–0 || 20 || 
|- style="background:#fcf;"
| 13 || November 7 || New Jersey Devils || 0–1 || 9–2–2–0 || 20 || 
|- style="background:#fcf;"
| 14 || November 9 || @ Washington Capitals || 1–4 || 9–3–2–0 || 20 || 
|- style="background:#ffc;"
| 15 || November 13 || Florida Panthers || 1–1 OT || 9–3–3–0 || 21 || 
|- style="background:#ffc;"
| 16 || November 15 || @ Carolina Hurricanes || 1–1 OT || 9–3–4–0 || 22 || 
|- style="background:#ffc;"
| 17 || November 16 || Boston Bruins || 2–2 OT || 9–3–5–0 || 23 || 
|- style="background:#cfc;"
| 18 || November 19 || @ Tampa Bay Lightning || 3–2 || 10–3–5–0 || 25 || 
|- style="background:#ffc;"
| 19 || November 21 || San Jose Sharks || 2–2 OT || 10–3–6–0 || 26 || 
|- style="background:#fcf;"
| 20 || November 23 || @ Toronto Maple Leafs || 0–6 || 10–4–6–0 || 26 || 
|- style="background:#fcf;"
| 21 || November 27 || @ Pittsburgh Penguins || 2–7 || 10–5–6–0 || 26 || 
|- style="background:#fcf;"
| 22 || November 29 || Toronto Maple Leafs || 0–3 || 10–6–6–0 || 26 || 
|- style="background:#cfc;"
| 23 || November 30 || @ Montreal Canadiens || 2–1 OT || 11–6–6–0 || 28 || 
|-

|-
| 24 || December 2 || New Jersey Devils || 0–1 OT || 11–6–6–1 || 29 || 
|- style="background:#cfc;"
| 25 || December 5 || New York Rangers || 3–2 OT || 12–6–6–1 || 31 || 
|- style="background:#fcf;"
| 26 || December 7 || St. Louis Blues || 1–3 || 12–7–6–1 || 31 || 
|- style="background:#cfc;"
| 27 || December 10 || @ Florida Panthers || 5–2 || 13–7–6–1 || 33 || 
|- style="background:#cfc;"
| 28 || December 12 || Toronto Maple Leafs || 2–1 || 14–7–6–1 || 35 || 
|- style="background:#cfc;"
| 29 || December 14 || Buffalo Sabres || 2–0 || 15–7–6–1 || 37 || 
|- style="background:#ffc;"
| 30 || December 17 || Dallas Stars || 2–2 OT || 15–7–7–1 || 38 || 
|- style="background:#cfc;"
| 31 || December 18 || @ Atlanta Thrashers || 3–1 || 16–7–7–1 || 40 || 
|- style="background:#fcf;"
| 32 || December 21 || Ottawa Senators || 1–3 || 16–8–7–1 || 40 || 
|- style="background:#ffc;"
| 33 || December 23 || @ Ottawa Senators || 2–2 OT || 16–8–8–1 || 41 || 
|- style="background:#cfc;"
| 34 || December 27 || @ Colorado Avalanche || 2–1 OT || 17–8–8–1 || 43 || 
|- style="background:#fcf;"
| 35 || December 28 || @ Phoenix Coyotes || 0–4 || 17–9–8–1 || 43 || 
|- style="background:#fcf;"
| 36 || December 30 || @ San Jose Sharks || 1–2 || 17–10–8–1 || 43 || 
|-

|- style="background:#cfc;"
| 37 || January 2 || @ Los Angeles Kings || 4–1 || 18–10–8–1 || 45 || 
|- style="background:#cfc;"
| 38 || January 3 || @ Mighty Ducks of Anaheim || 1–0 || 19–10–8–1 || 47 || 
|- style="background:#cfc;"
| 39 || January 5 || @ Atlanta Thrashers || 5–4 || 20–10–8–1 || 49 || 
|- style="background:#cfc;"
| 40 || January 7 || Buffalo Sabres || 3–2 || 21–10–8–1 || 51 || 
|- style="background:#cfc;"
| 41 || January 9 || @ New York Islanders || 4–0 || 22–10–8–1 || 53 || 
|- style="background:#cfc;"
| 42 || January 11 || Detroit Red Wings || 3–2 || 23–10–8–1 || 55 || 
|- style="background:#fcf;"
| 43 || January 13 || Atlanta Thrashers || 4–7 || 23–11–8–1 || 55 || 
|- style="background:#cfc;"
| 44 || January 16 || Montreal Canadiens || 4–1 || 24–11–8–1 || 57 || 
|- style="background:#cfc;"
| 45 || January 18 || Tampa Bay Lightning || 3–2 || 25–11–8–1 || 59 || 
|- style="background:#cfc;"
| 46 || January 19 || @ New York Rangers || 4–2 || 26–11–8–1 || 61 || 
|- style="background:#cfc;"
| 47 || January 21 || @ Toronto Maple Leafs || 3–1 || 27–11–8–1 || 63 || 
|- style="background:#fcf;"
| 48 || January 24 || New York Islanders || 1–3 || 27–12–8–1 || 63 || 
|-
| 49 || January 25 || @ Boston Bruins || 0–1 OT || 27–12–8–2 || 64 || 
|- style="background:#fcf;"
| 50 || January 28 || Tampa Bay Lightning || 0–3 || 27–13–8–2 || 64 || 
|- style="background:#fcf;"
| 51 || January 30 || @ New Jersey Devils || 1–5 || 27–14–8–2 || 64 || 
|-

|- style="background:#cfc;"
| 52 || February 4 || @ New York Islanders || 2–1 || 28–14–8–2 || 66 || 
|- style="background:#ffc;"
| 53 || February 6 || @ Ottawa Senators || 2–2 OT || 28–14–9–2 || 67 || 
|- style="background:#cfc;"
| 54 || February 8 || New York Rangers || 2–1 || 29–14–9–2 || 69 || 
|- style="background:#fcf;"
| 55 || February 10 || Minnesota Wild || 0–1 || 29–15–9–2 || 69 || 
|- style="background:#fcf;"
| 56 || February 12 || @ Minnesota Wild || 0–2 || 29–16–9–2 || 69 || 
|- style="background:#cfc;"
| 57 || February 13 || @ St. Louis Blues || 4–3 OT || 30–16–9–2 || 71 || 
|- style="background:#ffc;"
| 58 || February 15 || Carolina Hurricanes || 2–2 OT || 30–16–10–2 || 72 || 
|- style="background:#ffc;"
| 59 || February 18 || New Jersey Devils || 2–2 OT || 30–16–11–2 || 73 || 
|- style="background:#cfc;"
| 60 || February 20 || Los Angeles Kings || 5–0 || 31–16–11–2 || 75 || 
|- style="background:#fcf;"
| 61 || February 22 || Florida Panthers || 2–4 || 31–17–11–2 || 75 || 
|- style="background:#cfc;"
| 62 || February 25 || @ Chicago Blackhawks || 2–0 || 32–17–11–2 || 77 || 
|- style="background:#cfc;"
| 63 || February 27 || Chicago Blackhawks || 5–2 || 33–17–11–2 || 79 || 
|-

|- style="background:#cfc;"
| 64 || March 1 || @ Boston Bruins || 3–2 OT || 34–17–11–2 || 81 || 
|- style="background:#cfc;"
| 65 || March 4 || Vancouver Canucks || 3–0 || 35–17–11–2 || 83 || 
|- style="background:#fcf;"
| 66 || March 7 || @ New York Rangers || 1–5 || 35–18–11–2 || 83 || 
|-
| 67 || March 8 || Colorado Avalanche || 1–2 OT || 35–18–11–3 || 84 || 
|-
| 68 || March 10 || @ Washington Capitals || 1–2 OT || 35–18–11–4 || 85 || 
|- style="background:#cfc;"
| 69 || March 13 || Carolina Hurricanes || 5–3 || 36–18–11–4 || 87 || 
|- style="background:#cfc;"
| 70 || March 15 || @ Pittsburgh Penguins || 4–1 || 37–18–11–4 || 89 || 
|- style="background:#cfc;"
| 71 || March 17 || @ New Jersey Devils || 4–2 || 38–18–11–4 || 91 || 
|- style="background:#fcf;"
| 72 || March 18 || @ Buffalo Sabres || 2–5 || 38–19–11–4 || 91 || 
|- style="background:#cfc;"
| 73 || March 20 || Pittsburgh Penguins || 4–2 || 39–19–11–4 || 93 || 
|- style="background:#fcf;"
| 74 || March 22 || New York Rangers || 1–2 || 39–20–11–4 || 93 || 
|- style="background:#cfc;"
| 75 || March 24 || Atlanta Thrashers || 6–2 || 40–20–11–4 || 95 || 
|-  style="background:#ffc;"
| 76 || March 25 || @ Nashville Predators || 1–1 OT || 40–20–12–4 || 96 || 
|-  style="background:#ffc;"
| 77 || March 27 || Boston Bruins || 2–2 OT || 40–20–13–4 || 97 || 
|- style="background:#cfc;"
| 78 || March 29 || Pittsburgh Penguins || 3–0 || 41–20–13–4 || 99 || 
|- style="background:#cfc;"
| 79 || March 31 || @ Pittsburgh Penguins || 6–1 || 42–20–13–4 || 101 || 
|-

|- style="background:#cfc;"
| 80 || April 1 || Columbus Blue Jackets || 4–0 || 43–20–13–4 || 103 || 
|- style="background:#cfc;"
| 81 || April 4 || @ Tampa Bay Lightning || 4–1 || 44–20–13–4 || 105 || 
|- style="background:#cfc;"
| 82 || April 6 || @ Florida Panthers || 6–2 || 45–20–13–4 || 107 || 
|-

|-
| Legend:

Playoffs

|- style="background:#fcf;"
| 1 || April 9 || Toronto Maple Leafs || 3–5 || 18,937 || Maple Leafs lead 1–0 || 
|- style="background:#cfc;"
| 2 || April 11 || Toronto Maple Leafs || 4–1 || 19,597 || Series tied 1–1 || 
|- style="background:#fcf;"
| 3 || April 14 || @ Toronto Maple Leafs || 3–4 2OT || 19,533 || Maple Leafs lead 2–1 || 
|- style="background:#cfc;"
| 4 || April 16 || @ Toronto Maple Leafs || 3–2 3OT || 19,574 || Series tied 2–2 || 
|- style="background:#cfc;"
| 5 || April 19 || Toronto Maple Leafs || 4–1 || 19,828 || Flyers lead 3–2 || 
|- style="background:#fcf;"
| 6 || April 21 || @ Toronto Maple Leafs || 1–2 2OT || 19,573 || Series tied 3–3 || 
|- style="background:#cfc;"
| 7 || April 22 || Toronto Maple Leafs || 6–1 || 19,870 || Flyers win 4–3 || 
|-

|- style="background:#fcf;"
| 1 || April 25 || @ Ottawa Senators || 2–4 || 18,197 || Senators lead 1–0 || 
|- style="background:#cfc;"
| 2 || April 27 || @ Ottawa Senators || 2–0 || 18,500 || Series tied 1–1 || 
|- style="background:#fcf;"
| 3 || April 29 || Ottawa Senators || 2–3 OT || 19,680 || Senators lead 2–1 || 
|- style="background:#cfc;"
| 4 || May 1 || Ottawa Senators || 1–0 || 19,842 || Series tied 2–2 || 
|- style="background:#fcf;"
| 5 || May 3 || @ Ottawa Senators || 2–5 || 18,500 || Senators lead 3–2 || 
|- style="background:#fcf;"
| 6 || May 5 || Ottawa Senators || 1–5 || 19,454 || Senators win 4–2 || 
|-

|-
| Legend:

Player statistics

Scoring
 Position abbreviations: C = Center; D = Defense; G = Goaltender; LW = Left Wing; RW = Right Wing
  = Joined team via a transaction (e.g., trade, waivers, signing) during the season. Stats reflect time with the Flyers only.
  = Left team via a transaction (e.g., trade, waivers, release) during the season. Stats reflect time with the Flyers only.

Goaltending

Awards and records

Awards

Records

Among the team records set during the 2002–03 season was John LeClair scoring four goals against the Montreal Canadiens on October 15, tying the team record for most goals in a single game. On October 26, the Flyers set the team record for fastest two goals from the start of a game (31 seconds), also tying the same mark from the start of a period. Goaltender Roman Cechmanek’s 1.83 goals against average on the season is a team record. During game four of their conference quarterfinal playoff series against the Toronto Maple Leafs, the Flyers set team records for most shots on goal (75) and most shots on goal during a single overtime period (15). Three games during the series were decided in overtime, setting a team record for a single playoff series that was later tied during the 2020 Stanley Cup playoffs.

Milestones

Transactions
The Flyers were involved in the following transactions from June 14, 2002, the day after the deciding game of the 2002 Stanley Cup Finals, through June 9, 2003, the day of the deciding game of the 2003 Stanley Cup Finals.

Trades

Players acquired

Players lost

Signings

Draft picks

Philadelphia's picks at the 2002 NHL Entry Draft, which was held at the Air Canada Centre in Toronto, Ontario, on June 22–23, 2002. The Flyers traded their original first, 26th overall, second, 59th overall, and third-round picks, 92nd overall, and Maxime Ouellet to the Washington Capitals for Adam Oates on March 19, 2002. They also traded the Canucks' sixth-round pick, 184th overall, and their seventh-round pick, 225th overall, to the Columbus Blue Jackets for the Blue Jackets' 2003 fifth-round pick on June 23, 2002, and their eighth-round pick, 256th overall, to the Carolina Hurricanes for Paul Ranheim on May 31, 2000.

Farm teams
The Flyers were affiliated with the Philadelphia Phantoms of the American Hockey League and the Trenton Titans of the ECHL.

Notes

References

 
 
 

Phil
Phil
Philadelphia Flyers seasons
Philadelphia
Philadelphia